Oier is a masculine Basque given name of medieval origin.  It means "twisted."

It is among the top ten names for boys born in Basque Country.

Notes

Basque masculine given names
Medieval Basque given names